(born May 29, 1964 in Tokyo) is a Japanese master of Shotokan karate. He is a full-time instructor of the Japan Karate Association. He holds a 7th dan from JKA. He has also starred in films such as Kuro Obi, High Kick Girl! and Karate Girl.

Education
Naka started karate in his first year of junior high school. He attended Takushoku University.

Major tournament wins
35th JKA All Japan Karate Championship (1992)
1st place kumite
4th Shoto World Cup Karate Championship Tournament (Tokyo, 1992)
3rd place kumite
43rd JKA All Japan Karate Championship (2000)
3rd place kumite

References

1964 births
Living people
Japanese male actors
Japanese male karateka
Karate coaches
Sportspeople from Tokyo
Shotokan practitioners
Takushoku University alumni